Guys may refer to:

 Guys, Tennessee, a little town
 Constantin Guys (1802-1892), Dutch-born war correspondent, painter and illustrator
 The Guys, a 2002 play by Anne Nelson
 Guys (comics), the seventh novel in Canadian cartoonist Dave Sim's Cerebus comic book series
 GUYS, an attack team featured in the Japanese television series Ultraman Mebius
 KGuys, YouTube channel
 Guys Snack Foods, a snack foods manufacturer and distributor based in Overland Park, Kansas, with a target market being the Midwest.
 GUYS, an attack team featured in the Japanese television series Ultraman Mebius

See also
 Guy (disambiguation)